Pleurofusia longirostropsis is an extinct species of sea snail, a marine gastropod mollusk in the family Drilliidae.

Distribution
This extinct species was found in Oligocene strata of Mississippi, United States; age range: 33.9 to 28.4 Ma.

References

 W. P. Woodring. 1970. Geology and paleontology of canal zone and adjoining parts of Panama: Description of Tertiary mollusks (gastropods: Eulimidae, Marginellidae to Helminthoglyptidae). United States Geological Survey Professional Paper 306(D):299–452

longirostropsis
Gastropods described in 1890